Hoffpauir is a surname. Notable people with the surname include:

Jarrett Hoffpauir (born 1983), American baseball player, distant cousin of Micah
Micah Hoffpauir (born 1980), American baseball player

See also
Hoffpauir Airport, an airport in Harris County, Texas, United States